

The following lists events that happened during 1911 in Afghanistan.

Incumbents
 Monarch – Habibullah Khan

1911-1918
An Afghan nationalist, Mahmud Tarzi, publishes the periodical Seraj ol-Akbar ("Torch of the News"). It is the country's first medium for the intellectual exchange of ideas, and its political influence extends beyond the boundaries of Afghanistan.

1911
Again Afghanistan is "happy in having no history". The amir is loyal in carrying out the agreement for the removal of outlaws to beyond fifty miles of the Indian frontier, but this has not wholly stopped the raids. In Afghanistan itself the road between Kabul and Jalalabad is for a considerable time unsafe for traders, but matters improve towards the end of the year. The amir directs much attention to the improvement of the main roads throughout the country, more especially in the direction of Jalalabad and Kandahar.

References

 
Afghanistan
Years of the 20th century in Afghanistan
Afghanistan
1910s in Afghanistan